High Notes is the thirty-fourth studio album by American musician Hank Williams Jr. It was released by Elektra/Curb Records in April 1982, making it Williams' eighth studio album for Elektra/Curb and his ninth overall for the label. While not as successful or acclaimed as some of Williams' more recent recordings, High Notes was still a commercial success. It peaked at number 3 on the Billboard Top Country Albums chart and was certified Gold by the RIAA, becoming Williams' seventh album to do so. The album also generated two hit singles, "If Heaven Ain't a Lot Like Dixie" and "Honky Tonkin'". "If Heaven Ain't a Lot Like Dixie" peaked at number 5 on the Billboard Hot Country Singles & Tracks chart while "Honky Tonkin'", a song that was originally a number 14 hit written and performed by his father, Hank, Sr., became Hank, Jr.'s sixth Number One hit on the Billboard Hot Country Singles & Tracks chart.

Track listing
"If Heaven Ain't a Lot Like Dixie" (Billy Maddox, David Moore) – 2:43
"Whiskey on Ice" (Bobby Keel, Tony Stampley, Hank Williams Jr.) – 2:40
"High and Pressurized" (Williams Jr., Merle Kilgore) – 2:22
"I Can't Change My Tune" (Williams Jr.) – 3:12
"The South's Gonna Rattle Again" ("Wild" Bill Emerson, Jody Emerson, Vince Emerson) – 3:26
"Ain't Makin' No Headlines (Here Without You)" (Jessi Colter, Basil McDavid) – 3:02
"I've Been Down" (Keel, Stampley, Williams Jr.) – 3:39
"If You Wanna Get to Heaven" (Steve Cash, John Dillon) – 2:19
"Norwegian Wood (This Bird Has Flown)" (John Lennon, Paul McCartney) – 3:27
"Honky Tonkin'" (Hank Williams) – 2:14

Personnel
 Kenny Bell - acoustic guitar 
 Harold Bradley - classical guitar
 Roger Clark - drums
 Vernon Derrick - mandolin, fiddle
 Sonny Garrish - steel guitar
 Jim Glaser - backing vocals
 Paul Hatfield - keyboards
 David Hungate - bass
 Kieran Kane - mandolin
 Mike Lawler - organ
 Eddie Long - steel guitar
 Randy McCormick - synthesizer
 Terry McMillan - harmonica
 Terry Mead - trumpet
 Farrell Morris - percussion, congas
 Steve Nathan - keyboards
 Fred Newell - electric guitar
 Hargus "Pig" Robbins - keyboards
 Brent Rowan - electric guitar, acoustic guitar
 Randy Scruggs - banjo, acoustic guitar 
 Denis Solee - saxophone, flute
 Jo-El Sonnier - accordion
 Buddy Spicher - fiddle
 Bobby Thompson - banjo
 Harvey Thompson - saxophone
 Wayne Turner - electric guitar
 Billy Joe Walker Jr. - electric guitar 
 Tommy Williams - fiddle
 Reggie Young - electric guitar
 Hank Williams Jr. - vocals, banjo, acoustic guitar

Charts

Weekly charts

Year-end charts

References

1982 albums
Hank Williams Jr. albums
Elektra Records albums
Curb Records albums
Albums produced by Jimmy Bowen